The Moscow Boys Choir is a choral group of boys from Moscow, Russia.

History
Founded in 1957, the performing chorus is an all-boy choir under the direction of Leonid Baklushin.

Voices & Performances
Although most of the boys are sopranos, the adolescents also attain bass, baritone, and tenor range. There are usually 28–35 voices.

External links
https://web.archive.org/web/20070116153239/http://www.iaipresentations.com/mbc.html
http://www.sroartists.com/artists/moscowboyschoir/#
http://www.singers.com/choral/moscowboyschorus.html

Russian male singers
Choirs of children
Musical groups established in 1957
1957 establishments in Russia